John F. Reed (August 24, 1908 – September 29, 1992) was an American animator.

In the 1940s, Reed worked on major Disney productions such as Pinocchio, The Reluctant Dragon, and Bambi. As an assistant effects animator on Fantasia, he was responsible for making fine corrections to the motion of background elements such as fish and seaweed.  He was a protegee of artist Hanson Puthuff.

His most notable credit was as animation director for the 1954 film Animal Farm. As one colleague described, "Reed's influence on the animation in Animal Farm was tremendous. He knew exactly the effect he wanted and how to get it."

Filmography
 Pinocchio (1940) – animator
 Fantasia (1940) – animator, special animation effects
 The Reluctant Dragon (1941) – effects animator
 Bambi (1942) – animator
 The Grain That Built a Hemisphere (1943) - animator
 Contrary Condor (1944) – animator
 Donald's Off Day (1944) – animator
 The Three Caballeros (1944) – animator
 The Eyes Have It (1945) – animator
 No Sail (1945) – animator
 A Knight for a Day (1946) – animator
 Fun and Fancy Free (1947) – animator
 Animal Farm (1954) - animation director

References

External links
 
Sampling of John Reed's oil paintings and watercolors.

1908 births
1992 deaths
American animated film directors
Animators from California
Walt Disney Animation Studios people